Euston is a London Underground station. It directly connects with Euston main line station above it. The station is in Travelcard Zone 1.

Euston was constructed as two separate underground stations. Three of the four Northern line platforms date from the station's opening in 1907. The fourth Northern line platform and the two Victoria line platforms were constructed in the 1960s when the station was significantly altered to accommodate the Victoria line. Plans for High Speed 2 and Crossrail 2 both include proposals to modify the station to provide interchanges with the new services.

The station serves two branches of the Northern line and the Victoria line. On the Northern line's Bank branch, the station is between Camden Town and King's Cross St Pancras stations. On the Charing Cross branch, it is between Mornington Crescent and Warren Street stations. On the Victoria line, it is between Warren Street and King's Cross St. Pancras stations. The station is near Euston Square station allowing connections at street level to the Circle, Hammersmith & City and Metropolitan lines.

History

Northern line

Planning
An underground station to serve Euston station was first proposed by the Hampstead, St Pancras & Charing Cross Railway in 1891. The company planned a route to run from Heath Street in Hampstead to Strand in Charing Cross with a branch diverging from the main route to run under Drummond Street to serve Euston, St Pancras and King's Cross stations. Following parliamentary review of the proposals and a change in name to the Charing Cross, Euston and Hampstead Railway (CCE&HR), permission was granted for the route in 1893, although the branch line was only permitted as far as Euston.

For the remainder of the 1890s, the CCE&HR struggled unsuccessfully to raise the necessary capital to fund construction of the new line. Whilst doing so it continued to develop its route proposals. In 1899, parliamentary permission was obtained to modify the route so that the Euston branch was extended northwards to connect to the main route at the south end of Camden High Street. The section of the main route between the two ends of the loop was omitted. In 1900, the CCE&HR was taken over by a consortium led by American financier Charles Yerkes which raised the necessary finance.

The same year, a proposal was presented to Parliament by the Islington and Euston Railway (I&ER) for an extension of the City and South London Railway (C&SLR) from Angel to Euston. At the time, the C&SLR was in the process of constructing an extension to Angel from its recently opened terminus at Moorgate Street. The extension plan was initially permitted in 1901, but delays in the parliamentary process meant that it had to be re-submitted the following year. The second submission was opposed by the Metropolitan Railway, which saw the extension as competition to its service between King's Cross and Moorgate, and the plan was rejected. A third attempt, presented to parliament in November 1902 by the C&SLR itself, was successful and approved in 1903.

Construction and opening

With funding obtained, tunnelling for the CCE&HR was carried out between September 1903 and December 1905, after which the station buildings and fitting-out of the tunnels commenced. The C&SLR's Euston extension was constructed at the same time from the newly opened Angel station and opened on 12 May 1907, with the station building designed by Sidney Smith located on the east side of Eversholt Street. The CCE&HR opened on 22 June 1907; its building, designed by Leslie Green, is located at the corner of Drummond Street and Melton Street.

Although built and initially operated as two separate stations by the two companies, the C&SLR and the CCE&HR platforms were sufficiently close together that a deep level interchange was constructed between the passages of the two stations with a small ticket office for passengers changing between the lines. Another passage led to lifts that surfaced within the main line station itself. With the entrance within the main line station able to serve both sets of platforms satisfactorily, the separate station buildings were considered unnecessary, and they both closed on 30 September 1914. The CCE&HR building remains (converted for use as an electrical substation), but the C&SLR's building was demolished in 1934 to enable the construction of Euston House for the London, Midland and Scottish Railway.

Reconstruction and extension
The smaller tunnel size restricted the capacity of the C&SLR's trains and, in 1912, the C&SLR published a bill for their enlargement. A separate bill was published at the same time by the London Electric Railway (LER), that included plans to construct tunnels to connect the C&SLR at Euston to the CCE&HR's station at Camden Town. Together, the works proposed in these bills would enable trains of each company to run over the route of the other, effectively combining the two separate railways. The reconstruction and extension works were postponed during World War I and did not begin until 1922. The C&SLR platforms and the tunnels between Euston and Moorgate were closed for the reconstruction on 8 August 1922. They reopened on 20 April 1924 along with the new link to Camden Town.

London & North Western Railway

In 1906, the London and North Western Railway (LNWR), operator of the main line station, announced proposals to construct an underground station of its own. The single platform underground station would have been close to the CCE&HR's platforms. The proposal was presented to Parliament in November 1906 and received royal assent on 26 July 1907. The LNWR did not proceed with the loop plan and the underground station, which were dropped in 1911.

Victoria line

Planning
Plans for the route that eventually became the Victoria line date from the 1940s. A proposal for a new underground railway line linking north-east London with the centre was included in the County of London Plan in 1943. Between 1946 and 1954, a series of routes were proposed by different transport authorities to connect various places in south and north or north-east London. Each of these connected the three main line termini at King's Cross, Euston and Victoria. A route was approved in 1955 with future extensions to be decided later, though funding for the construction was not approved by the government until 1962.

Construction and opening

At Euston, major reconstruction works were undertaken to incorporate the new Victoria line platforms so that cross-platform interchanges could be provided with the Northern line's Bank branch—the former C&SLR route to King's Cross and Bank. Unlike the Charing Cross branch tracks, which were in separate tunnels with side platforms, the Bank branch tracks served an island platform in a single large tunnel. These platforms suffered from dangerous overcrowding at peak times. To provide cross-platform interchange, a new section of tunnel was constructed for northbound Bank branch trains, which were diverted to a new platform south of the original alignment. The redundant northbound track bed in the station tunnel was filled in to form a wider southbound platform. The new Victoria line platforms were excavated between and parallel to the original and the new Bank branch tunnels. Each pair of platforms was linked via a concourse served by escalators.

In conjunction with the reconstruction of the main line station above, a new ticket hall was excavated below the concourse with two sets of escalators replacing the lifts. The escalators provide access to and from an intermediate passenger circulation level, which, in turn, gives access to the Northern line Charing Cross branch platforms and two further sets of escalators; one set each serving the northbound and southbound Victoria and Northern line Bank branch platforms. Interchanges between the northbound and southbound Victoria and Northern Bank Line platforms are made via a passageway at the lower level so as to avoid the need to use the escalators. An emergency stair to the intermediate interchange level is located midway along the passageway. The Victoria line platforms opened on 1 December 1968 when the second section of the line was opened between Highbury & Islington and Warren Street. Disused passages remain with tiling and posters from the 1960s.

Future proposals
Unlike the neighbouring main line termini, St Pancras and King's Cross, Euston is not served by the Circle, Hammersmith & City and Metropolitan lines. Plans for the redevelopment of the main line station for High Speed 2 (HS2) include the construction of a direct connection to Euston Square. The CCE&HR station building on Melton Street sits within the HS2 development site area and will be demolished to make way for the station.

Proposals for Crossrail 2 include an underground station serving Euston and St Pancras that will be integrated with the existing London Underground station.

A new underground line between Euston and Canary Wharf has been suggested and is being considered by the government.

Services
The station is in Travelcard Zone 1. On the Northern line's Bank branch the station is between Camden Town and King's Cross St Pancras. On the Charing Cross branch it is between Mornington Crescent and Warren Street. On the Victoria line it is between Warren Street and King's Cross St. Pancras. Train frequencies vary throughout the day, but generally, Northern line trains operate every 2–6 minutes from approximately 05:49 to 00:45 northbound and 05:49 to 00:28 southbound. Victoria line trains operate every 1–6 minutes from approximately 05:41 to 00:42 northbound and 05:31 to 00:26 southbound.

Connections
London Bus routes 18, 30, 59, 68, 73, 91, 168, 205, 253, 390 and 476 and night routes N5, N20, N91 and N253 serve Euston bus station outside the main line station.

Notes and references

Notes

References

Bibliography

External links

 Clive's Underground Lines Guide – Northern Line, section on King's cross Loop
 London Transport Museum Photographic Archive
 
 
 
 
 
 

Northern line stations
Victoria line stations
London Underground Night Tube stations
Tube stations in the London Borough of Camden
Former City and South London Railway stations
Former Charing Cross, Euston and Hampstead Railway stations
Railway stations in Great Britain opened in 1907 
Railway stations in Great Britain opened in 1968